Hypomelina is a subtribe of darkling beetles in the family Tenebrionidae. There are about 9 genera and more than 40 described species in Hypomelina, found mainly in southern Africa. The majority of species were described from the Namibian coast, and only the genus Bombocnodulus is found as far north as central Africa.

Genera
These nine genera belong to the subtribe Hypomelina:
 Argenticrinis Louw, 1979
 Bombocnodulus Koch, 1955
 Brinckia Koch, 1962
 Hypomelus Solier, 1843
 Iugidorsum Louw, 1979
 Sulcipectus Louw, 1979
 Trachynotidus Péringuey, 1899
 Triangulipenna Louw, 1979
 Uniungulum Koch, 1962

References

Tenebrionoidea